Bučioniai (formerly) is a village in Kėdainiai district municipality, in Kaunas County, in central Lithuania. According to the 2011 census, the village was uninhabited.

Demography

Notable people
 Kazys Blaževičius (1926–2015), a Lithuanian engineer

References

Villages in Kaunas County
Kėdainiai District Municipality